The 1922 South Carolina gubernatorial election was held on November 7, 1922, to select the governor of the state of South Carolina. Thomas Gordon McLeod won the Democratic primary and ran unopposed in the general election becoming the 95th governor of South Carolina.

Democratic primary
The South Carolina Democratic Party held their primary for governor in the summer of 1922 and it shaped up to be a heated contest between Thomas Gordon McLeod and former Governor Cole Blease. McLeod emerged victorious from the runoff and effectively became the next governor of South Carolina because there was no opposition in the general election on account of South Carolina's status as an effective one-party state.

General election
The general election was held on November 7, 1922 and Thomas McLeod was elected the next governor of South Carolina without opposition. Being a non-presidential election and few contested races, turnout was approximately half of that for 1920.

 

|-
| 
| colspan=5 |Democratic hold
|-

See also
Governor of South Carolina
List of governors of South Carolina
South Carolina gubernatorial elections

References
"Report of the Secretary of State to the General Assembly of South Carolina.  Part II." Reports of State Officers Boards and Committees to the General Assembly of the State of South Carolina. Volume I. Columbia, South Carolina: 1923, p. 57.

External links
SCIway Biography of Thomas Gordon McLeod

1922 United States gubernatorial elections
1922
Gubernatorial
November 1922 events